Amazonas is a department and region in northern Peru bordered by Ecuador on the north and west, Cajamarca on the west, La Libertad on the south, and Loreto and San Martín on the east. Its capital is the city of Chachapoyas.

With a landscape of steep river gorges and mountains, Amazonas is the location of Kuelap, a huge stone fortress enclosing more than 400 stone structures; it was built on a mountain about 3,000 meters high, starting about 500 AD and was occupied to the mid-16th century. It is one of Peru's major archeological sites.

Geography

The department of Amazonas consists of regions covered by rainforests and mountain ranges. The rainforest zone predominates (72.93%) and it extends to the north over its oriental slope, up to the border with Ecuador in the summits of the Cordillera del Cóndor. The mountain range zone is located in the southern provinces of the Amazonas Region and it only includes 27.07% of its whole territorial surface.

One of the factors that help to give big importance to its geography is not only that the big valleys and plains of its rainforest zone are the closest to the Pacific Ocean, but also its connections with the routes of the coast are the lowest. This is because they use the Paso de Porculla (the mountain pass of Porculla) that is located at 2,144 m. This is the lowest pass of the whole Peruvian Andes to arrive to the Pan-American road system.

The vast and deep Marañón valley  which constitutes one of the most important morphologic features of the region.

The Marañón valley crosses a big part of its territory and expands itself from south to north. It reaches its greatest width in the province of Bagua. It narrows when it crosses the Cordillera Oriental (Spanish for "eastern mountain range") in its most violent route towards the east, towards the lowest part of the Amazon. It crosses those wonderful canyons and natural porches called punkus, a Quechua word that means doors.

The Utkupampa valley which is the real axis of the department of Amazonas is located between 5° and 6° of south latitude and 78° and 79° of west longitude. It is longitudinally developed up to the Marañón River, in which it flowed at 400 m.

This zone is the principal center of production and human groups location. It is developed in four very pronounced sectors:

 Vertiente del Marañon (Marañon's spring), that has important quebradas (Seca, Bocana, Copallín Nuevo and Choloque).
 Valle Medio (the middle valley) that has eleven quebradas in its both borders.
 Valle Alto (the high valley) that has seven quebradas. The most important one is Magunchal.
 Planicie de Bagua (the Bagua's plain), wavy and picturesque, that is located at 550 m. In some places, it mounts up to 900 m., for example in the inhabited point called La Peca.

The principal tributaries of the Utkupampa are the Chiriaco, the Nieva, the Santiago (that is born in Ecuador) and the Cenepa, that is born in the north zone of the Cordillera del Cóndor. The Cenepa River receives in its trip numerous tributaries like the Comaina. It flowed in the Marañon river, located near Orellana (Condorcanqui Province).

Route to Huallaga Central: Plain of Bagua

The Utkupampa valley which is born in the high jalcas of the Chachapoyas Province and which runs from southeast to northwest to mix with the waters of the Marañón River, forms the immense plain of Bagua. This plain has a warm climate, which temperature can reach a maximum of 40 °C, being the minimum one 21 °C.

Like in the whole high jungle region of Peru –head of mountain-, its water regimen is irregular and sometimes without rains.

Some of the important places inside this route are the touristic corridor of the Utkupampa and the lake Pumaqucha.

History

Some excavation of archaeological sites covered over by the rain forest have attested to the presence of humans in the area since ancient times. Most of the Pre-Hispanic cultures that became prosperous in the area are still a mystery due to the lack of research. Deep in the interior, Kuélap's Fortress is an ancient walled city and archeological site in the mountains. The largest stone complex in South America, it is located 3,000 meters above sea level, higher than the site of Machu Picchu. It is located above the Amazon River, where it bends before entering the broad lowland basin. A huge construction of military architecture, Kuélap's Fortress includes the ruins of some 450 houses.

The Chachapoyas culture developed during the Inca age; these people strongly opposed the Incan conquest and repelled the first Inca attempts to incorporate the region to their empire in the 15th century.

The Spanish colonial region's capital, Chachapoyas, was founded in 1538 by Alonso de Alvarado. During the same year, its first church was built. Later the Santa Ana, San Lázaro and Señor de Burgos churches were built. In April 1821, the city's inhabitants expelled the Spaniards and ignored their rule, following the steps taken by the San Martín liberating army as Peru gained independence from Spain.

The area of the Amazonas Region was strongly linked to the movement for independence. The cleric Toribio Rodríguez de Mendoza was its most outstanding representative, encouraging the patriots of this era and signing the National Act of Independence.

The Cordillera del Condor, located in this region, was the scene of the border war between Peru and Ecuador in 1981.

European conquest
The natives of the region received in a jubilant and cordial way the first Spanish who came into Amazonas. They knew about their arrival in Peru by the news that they had received from Cajamarca.

Those people had told Francisco Pizarro that Chachapoyas was an excellent agricultural region where the people possessed a lot of gold and silver. The conquistador did not lose time and formed an expedition of 20 men, putting captain Alonso de Alvarado in charge of it, with the express order to found a Christian city at Chachapoyas.

The chroniclers say that, when the Spanish arrived to the region, the Chachapoyas people gave big parties in their honor and gave them many rich gifts willingly, also numerous examples of appreciation, including showing some interest to become Christians.

Pizarro decided to send a second expedition, this time with instructions to take possession of the zone, delivering Alvarado a provision so he would be able to found the city of San Juan de la Frontera de los Chachapoyas.

But this time Pizarro's envoy met the bellicose resistance of a curaca called Huamán, whom they had to defeat before coming to their destination, where they founded the mentioned city on September 5, 1538.

Alvarado had chosen a place called Jalca, which apparently did not have the demanded conditions. This was the reason why the location of the flaming city was changed several times.

According to the papers of the epoch, the last time that a change was made was in 1544, but it is unknown when the city was established in its current place.

The same day of Chachapoyas' foundation, the members of the first cabildo were elected, turning out to be designated the councillors Gómez de Alvarado, Alonso de Chávez, Gonzalo de Trujillo, Gonzalo de Guzmán, Luis Valera (father of the chronicler Blas Valera), Pedro Romero, Bernardino de Anaya and Francisco de Fuentes.

According to the Spanish custom, the layout of the city was made by means of rectilinear design streets.

European colonization

A few years after its foundation, the prosperity of the region began to demonstrate itself in magnificent constructions in the city of Chachapoyas, with big courts, wide lounges and architectural characteristics adapted to the zone.

The colonial aspect of Chachapoyas stays almost intact until now, and it is one of the most attractive characteristics of this old city.

A refined religious feeling was one of the characteristics that distinguished the settlers of this region during the colonial period. In the same year of the foundation of Chachapoyas, the first church was built. Its first priest was Hernando Gutiérrez Palacios. Later the churches of Santa Ana, San Lázaro and Señor de Burgos were built.

Three religious convents were also established: San Francisco, La Merced and that of the betlehemitas. The majority of the persons who settled in Chachapoyas from the time of its foundation were people with nobility, but poor. They were living in a modest and worthily way and they devoted themselves to agriculture and mining. Many settlers achieved a loose economic position, keeping, nevertheless, the austerity of the customs that was one of the highlight points of Chachapoyas' social life.

With time the settlers were spreading to other zones of the region, such as Luya, city that was established in 1569 by the governor Lope García de Castro, ratified later in its administrative organization by the viceroy Francisco de Toledo.

There it bloomed an agriculture of varied production and the upbringing of dairy, sheep and equine cattle.

In one of his pastoral visits, Saint Toribio de Mogrovejo visited the principal populations of this department in this epoch.

Independence
The inhabitants of Chachapoyas became involved in the movement for independence. In April 1821, helping the action of San Martin's liberating army, they ignored the Spanish authorities, exiling the subdelegate Francisco Baquedano and the bishop of Maynas Hipólito Sánchez, who were fighting openly against independence.

Noted patriots born in Amazonas include:
 Mariano Aguilar
 Manuel Rodríguez
 Luis Zagaceta
 Lucero Villacorta
 Juan Reina
 José Fabián Rodríguez
 Dionisio Hernández

The military chief of Moyobamba, colonel José Matos, organized an army of 600 men, who confronted the patriots on June 6, 1821, in Higos Urco pampa. Although the latter lacked training, military knowledge or discipline, they faced the realistas determined to give their lives in defense of the proclaimed freedom.
Matea Rimachi was an Amazonas woman renowned as a heroine of Higos Urco.

Toribio Rodríguez de Mendoza, a professor, politician, philosopher and jurist, was one of the most important patriot leaders of the Amazonas.  He signed the record of national independence in Lima. He was the rector of the Convictorio de San Carlos, member of the Sociedad Amantes del País (Lovers of the Country Society), founder and collaborator of the newspaper Mercurio Peruano, deputy of the Spanish Parliament and congressman of the first Constituent Congress, in which the majority of its members were his disciples.

Republic
The department of Amazonas was created by a law issued by the government of the marshal Agustín Gamarra, promulgated on November 21, 1832. The initiative belonged to two illustrious children of Chachapoyas: Modesto de la Vega and José Braulio de Camporredondo. Camporredondo was in charge of the presidency of the republic, in absence of the marshall Gamarra.

The same law contained a series of norms to promote the economic development of the new Hindu network including exonerations of rights in its commerce with Ecuador or Brazil. In accordance with this law, the regions of Pataz, Chachapoyas and Maynas will stay inside the limits of the Amazonas Region.

Salaverry tried futilely to annul the creation of this department that, later, according to diverse demarcating dispositions was diminishing in its area. Most of its territory was dismembered in 1866, when the department of Loreto was created.

The creation of its current provinces was realized in the following dates:

 On February 12, 1821, Chachapoyas.
 On February 5, 1861, Luya.
 On December 26, 1870, Bongará.
 On October 31, 1932, Rodríguez de Mendoza.
 On September 1, 1941, Bagua.
 On May 18, 1984, Condorcanqui.
 On May 30, 1984, Utcubamba.

The colonial splendour of Chachapoyas, almost a complete city, was disappearing during the Republic because it had been imposed in the country new means of transport that were turning it in a cloistered and outlying city from the rest of the country.

Chachapoyas remained this way during more than one century in the Republic. Without highways of access, the route had to be done on horse, in long and painful caravans from the coast, or by the rivers from the region of the east. Such situation continue until 1960, date in which the highway arrived to Chachapoyas, although it had been already preceded by air transport.

Later, during the last government of the doctor Manuel Prado, there was constructed and inaugurated the highway that joins Chachapoyas with the big route of penetration Olmos-Marañon. With this, Amazonas was put in direct communication with Lima and the rest of the Republic.

Amazonas ancestors 
The department of Amazonas possesses a great past that is still precariously evaluated and spread. On its borders, there are fabulous archaeological testimonies like Cuélap, the most extensive monument of the Peruvian ancestral past. Cuélap was the main city of the Chachapoyas culture in their peak years.

Chachapoyas

When the Spanish arrived in Peru in the 16th century, the Chachapoya were among the many nations incorporated into the Inca Empire. Their incorporation to the Inca Empire had not been easy, due to the sprouts of resistance that the chachapoyas offered repeatedly to the Inca's troops.

The chronicler Pedro Cieza de León offers some notes about the Chachapoyas:

Cieza adds that, after the annexation to the Inca Empire, the Chachapoya apparently adopted the customs imposed by the people from the department of Cuzco.

The meaning of the word chachapoya is unknown. If it is in the Quechua language, it may have been derived from sacha-p-collas, meaning the "colla people who live in the woods" (sacha = wild p = of the colla = nation in which Aimara is spoken).

The Chachapoya territory was very extensive. It included the triangular space that is shaped by the confluence of the Marañón and Utcubamba rivers in the zone of Bagua, up to the basin of the Abiseo river. In this place are the Chachapoya's ruins of Pajatén. To the south, their territory extended to the Chontayacu river. That was beyond the current border of Amazonas. The center of the Chachapoyas culture was the basin of the Utcubamba river.

this territory has been defined by the remains of structures in the distinctive Chachapoya architectural style. Garcilazo de la Vega records that the Chachapoyas' territory was so extensive that,

(The league was a measurement that covered about 5 kilometers.)

The area of the Chachapoyas corresponds to a region that was part of a mountain range and covered by dense tropical woods. It was named as the Amazonian Andes, to replace the former "mountain region".

As fast as the population was growing, the forests of the Amazonian Andes were felled in order to extend the agricultural area. This resulted in destruction of the rain forest and desertification, since the climate and rain combined to make a soil of low fertility. Many plants could not be cultivated here, but deforestation exposed the land to aridity. Soil erosion has taken place in areas that became deforested. In the 21st century, the Amazonian Andes resemble the barren scenery of the Andean moorlands.

The Amazonian Andes are constituted by the oriental flank of the Andes, covered originally by a dense Amazon vegetation. It spread from the cordillera spurs until reaching surprising altitudes where the forests have not been felled, in certain cases exceeding the 3 500 m.

The Amazonian Andes have a height range of 2 to 3,000 meters of altitude, where the Chachapoya could develop their settlements. The numerous architectural remains show they were well established here.

Before the Inca Empire

The Amazonas Region has a millennial history. There are some testimonies exhibited on rocky walls dated from the most remote times. Such is the case of the rock paintings of Chiñuña-Yamón and Limones-Calpón in the province of Utcubamba. A part of these haughty pictorial samples was made by people that had a hunting economy. These people perhaps left their trace 6 or 7 thousand years ago. At the times in which the formation of Peruvian civilization was consolidated, it appeared a type of ceramics mainly identified in Bagua.

From the Chachapoyas culture, there are innumerable architectural remains, such as Cuélap, Congón (place that was re-baptized by the name of Vilaya), Olán, Purunllaqta (place that was re-baptized by the name of Monte Peruvia), Pajatén, etc. All these expressions of architecture show a model that allows to identify them like if they are related to each other. What has not been established yet is the age of these architectural remains, neither which one would be the most ancient and which one the last in the cultural development of the chachapoyas.

Main cultural testimonies

Some of the archaeological testimonies that talk about the cultural splendour reached by the Chachapoyas in pre-Inca times are fantastic. These principally refer to two forms of grave and one wall painting.

These are some of the most important archeological sites found in the Amazonas Region:
Sarcophagi of Carajía
Revash's mausoleums
Tunnels of San Antonio
Kuelap

Political division

The region is divided into 7 provinces (provincias, singular: provincia) which are composed of 83 districts (distritos, singular: distrito). The provinces and their capitals are:

Demographics

Languages 
According to the 2007 Peru Census, the language learnt first by most of the residents was Spanish (84.90%). The following table shows the results concerning the language learnt first in the Amazonas Region by province:

Ethnicity 
The majority of the population is Mestizo. Among others the region is populated by Aguaruna and Huambisa people.

Religion

Literacy 
In 2017, 83.4% (326,784) of the population is literate and 16.6% (65,235) of the population is illiterate.

Folklore

The folklore of Amazonas is not as varied as in other departments of Peru.

The profusion of dances, songs and clothing is not seen in here, like in Puno or Cuzco. Its folklore is nourished from legends and stories in which mystery and inexplicable things are always present. Towns, lagoons, hills, religious images, always have an origin that violates in an invariable way the rules of logic or biology.

For example, if you ask people about the lake Quchakunka (Cochaconga) they will say that it is enchanted. They say it has the "form of a neck" and that with the smallest noise provoked by an animal or the scream of a person, there will be a tremendous thunderstorm in which an enormous monster will appear in the shape of cow. This monster will become mad with the strangers. That's why, whoever passes by this remote place, does it with maximum precautions for not altering the local silence.

To give accommodation to travelers is an elementary norm of good behaviour with people. To deny it can provoke the most tremendous evil on the selfish person. An irrefutable evidence is the marsh of Mono Muerto (Dead Monkey's marsh), in the Huambo District (Rodríguez de Mendoza Province). A dramatic story that people tell, with more or less details, but with the same respect.

A very rich man was living in his house. The marsh was a part of his estate, in which he was happy and lacking of nothing, until the day a traveler asked him for home and he denied it to him. A witch doctor of the surroundings, who found out about the attitude of the wealthy neighbor, entrusted that all the curses fell on him. All his goods disappeared and his grounds became a stinking marsh.

Mysterious power are also assumed to the four lagoons of Pukyu, in which there are monsters that influence the crops, as well as to the lake Santa Barbara which disappears before the view of the walkers and it is destined to initiate the end of the world with the overflow of its waters.

Next to the city Chachapoyas there is a hill called Pisquwañuna (Piscohuañuna), in the way towards the forest. This name means "where the bird dies", because the mountain kills all the birds that approach it.

People attribute pernicious influences to certain animals like the mochuelo that "freezes the soul", or  "quien-quien", that makes fun of the travelers in the roads; or the cricket, which singing in certain circumstances, like when it has sound of bells, presages big evil.

People have big respect to the antique remains. They firmly believe that there will be terrifying punishments for those who violate the graves of the "agüelos" (mummies).

Most of the population of the department of Amazonas is indigenous and mestizo, being notable the people' quantity, in some cases entire communities, in which the Spanish type predominates. Since the time of the Incas, there are legends about the existence of white people in these places. There are also versions gathered by chroniclers in which they assure that women were chosen here for the Inca, precisely because they were white.

Dances

Some of the dances most representative of the Department of Amazonas are:

 The Chumaichada
 Huanca (dance)
 The Danzantes de Levanto (Levanto's Dancers)
 Carnaval en Amazonas (Carnival in Amazonas)

Religious festivities

Religiousness is an outstanding note in the most of these towns and they demonstrate it through the enthusiasm and withdrawal that they put into these celebrations. But, faithful to their tradition, their religious beliefs are mixed with fantastic apparitions and there is almost always a cave in them.

There are three Virgins who are famous:
Virgen de Belén (Virgin of Bethlehem) in Chachapoyas.
Virgen de Sonche (Virgin of Sonche)
Virgen de Levanto (Virgin of Levanto)

Well, there is no one who does not believe the story that said that the three Virgins were found in a cave to which a young shepherd was mysteriously attracted. And when the Virgin of Levanto goes to Chachapoyas "her sisters" go to the outer parts of the town for "receiving her".

The venerated image of Santa Lucía (Saint Lucy) was also found by a girl in a cave. Cristo de Bagazán (Christ of Bagazán), who is venerated in Rioja, was also found by a stockbreeder who was looking for a lost ox. Near Almirante, he heard a voice that was calling him by his name from the interior of a cave, in which he found a Christ image that told him: "take me".

In days of long drought, Cristo de la Contradicción (the Christ of Contradiction) disappears from the chapel of the cemetery of Chachapoyas and he is "discovered" when it begins to rain, beginning then big celebrations up to the time of taking him to his place again.

Corpus Christi, Holy Week, the Assumption, Dia de los Difuntos (Day of the death), and Christmas  are classic dates in the calendar of this department. In Christmas Days there are groups of little shepherds that walk around the streets singing and dancing in front of the cribs. With the same splendour, the patronal feasts are celebrated in all the towns.

One of the most well-known and traditional celebrations is known as:

Los pastorcillos de Navidad (Christmas's little shepherds)

Typical dishes
Some of the most well-known and delicious typical dishes of this region are the following:

Tamalitos
Cazuela
Carne arrollada (rolled beef)
Purtumute
Humitas de choclo (sweet tamale made of corn)
Chipasmute
Plátanos rellenos (stuffed bananas)

Economy

This department includes inter-Andean and forest regions. It has a strong forest and hydro energy potential. The province of Bagua, because of geographical factors, has an agricultural development producing such commodity crops as rice, coffee, Cocoa bean, fruit trees and livestock.

The department of Amazonas presents three well-defined geographical areas with distinct climates:
 District of El Cenepa (province of Condorcanqui), humid tropical forest
 Province of Bagua, has a dry tropical forest; and
 The other provinces have the Amazonian very humid low mountainous forest, humid subtropical forest, and dry low mountainous forest.

The provinces of Bongará, Luya and Chachapoyas present a very hilly geographical configuration, that gives them mountain range characteristics. They have been called the Amazonian Andes.

Amazonas has a primarily agrarian economy. It also features mining and energy, specifically, hydropower and oil development.

The department has excellent and favorable conditions in both: climate and pastures availability for the agricultural-livestock development.

The information about structure of the agricultural surface, size of the agricultural units, main cultivations and cattle population is taken from what was recorded in the III National Agricultural Census 1994 (III CENAGRO), made by the Instituto Nacional de Estadística e Informática (INEI) (National Institute of Statistics and Informatics).

This 0.1% are exclusively dedicated to the breeding of animals.

Structure of the agricultural area

* It only considers the area of the agricultural units that have worked lands.

From the total of agricultural lands (9750.34 km2), only 16,4% includes the agricultural area and 83,6% includes the non-agricultural area.

Size of the agricultural units and principal cultivations

* It only considers the area of the agricultural units that have worked lands.

Rice is the main transitory cultivation of the department. It brings together 18.5% of the agricultural surface with transitory cultivations (129.42 km2). Dry yellow maize with  (17.9%) is the second important one.

Livestock population by species

Cattle is the most important one in the department. It is raised in 21,857 AU (Agricultural units) with a population of 139,267 head of cattle. Pigs are the second one with 34,421 head, distributed in 14,573 AU.

Climate, rates and distance information

Culture

Institutions that are linked with the Amazon Region
Several institutions are linked with the Amazon region in Peru and help its economic and social development and preservation. These include the following: 
 Asociación Interétnica de Desarrollo de la Selva (AIDESEP) – Interethnic Association for the Rainforest Development
 Centro Amazónico de Antropología y Aplicación Práctica (CAAAP) – Amazon Center of Anthropology and Practical Application
 Instituto Lingüístico de Verano – Linguistic Summer Institute

Notable natives and residents

 Blas Valera
 Toribio Rodríguez de Mendoza
 Manuel Antonio Mesones Muro
 José del Carmen Marín

Places of interest 
 Cordillera de Colán Reserved Zone
 Ichigkat Muja – Cordillera del Condor National Park
 Santiago-Comaina Reserved Zone
 Gocta Cataracts

See also 
Amazonas State, Venezuela
Amazonas State, Brazil
Amazonas before the Inca Empire

Sources

External links
Amazonas region official website 
Peru Info: Amazonas Region 
Chachapoyas map

 
Amazonas
Upper Amazon